Pieter Schlosser (born August 17, 1980) is a Guatemalan-American film and television composer best known for Destiny 2, You, Me and the Apocalypse, The Lying Game, and Transformers: Dark of the Moon. He has also composed scores for multiple studio films and network television shows.

Early life and influences 
Schlosser was born in Guatemala City, Guatemala to a Dutch mother and Costa Rican father of German descent, who introduced him to jazz and classical music at a young age. He cites opera, musicals and Disney films as his earliest influences. During his childhood, his family lived and traveled between Guatemala, Austria, Panama, and Costa Rica, enabling him to expand his musical vocabulary. While living in Austria, he began singing in choirs and learned to play the piano. After moving to Panama, he began singing in a Swedish choir which sang in Spanish, English, French, German, and Swedish. He began learning saxophone and, after moving to Costa Rica, playing in symphonic bands, youth orchestra, and small jazz ensembles.

During high school, he bought the music software Cakewalk Pro Audio and began composing his own music. While graduating from the German high school in Costa Rica, Schlosser wrote a song inspired by Pat Metheny Group. The Latin Grammy Award-winning world music group Editus, who was recording an album with songs by Costa Rican composers, included Schlosser's work in their album Calle Del Viento.

He attended the Berklee College of Music in Boston on a partial scholarship, where he completed a double major in Film Scoring and Music Production and Engineering. He then relocated to Los Angeles to pursue a career in film composition.

Career 
Schlosser began his career in Hans Zimmer's studio Remote Control Productions, through the connections he made while working at The Record Plant in Hollywood, in which he met Alan Myerson. He worked for five years alongside Steve Jablonsky on multiple films and television series, including The Amityville Horror, The Island, The Texas Chainsaw Massacre: The Beginning, Desperate Housewives, Friday the 13th, and the Transformers film series. While working for Steve Jablonsky, Schlosser contributed additional music and conducted a small orchestra while recording the score for all nine seasons of Desperate Housewives.

In 2014, Schlosser was one of over a hundred people who were given the ASCAP Award for Top Television Series for his work on Freeform's The Lying Game.

In 2015, he composed the score for NBC's You, Me and the Apocalypse. During that same year, he also worked with the Costa Rica National Symphony Orchestra and arranged a full orchestral performance of his original music in collaboration with Editus. In 2017, he scored the film What About Love starring Sharon Stone and Andy Garcia. In 2018, the IMAX film In Saturn's Rings for which he composed the opening music is set to be released.

Schlosser has also composed scores for video games, including Destiny 2, Gears of War 2, and Gears of War 3, The Sims 3, and Transformers: The Game.

Filmography / Discography

Films

Television

Video games

Awards and nominations

ASCAP Awards 

|-
| 2014
| Freeform's The Lying Game
| ASCAP Award for Top Television Series
| 
|-
|}

References

External links 
 Pieter Schlosser Official Site
 
 Pieter Schlosser on SoundCloud

1980 births
ASCAP composers and authors
American film score composers
American male film score composers
American television composers
Berklee College of Music alumni
Guatemalan expatriates in the United States
Guatemalan film score composers
Living people
Male television composers
Video game composers